The Baptist Faith and Message (BF&M) is the statement of faith of the Southern Baptist Convention (SBC). It summarizes key Southern Baptist thought in the areas of the Bible and its authority, the nature of God as expressed by the Trinity, the spiritual condition of man, God's plan of grace and salvation, the purpose of the local church, ordinances, evangelism, Christian education, interaction with society, religious liberty, and the family.

History
Although the Southern Baptist Convention was organized in 1845, no formal confession of faith was adopted until internationally known Baptist theologian Edgar Young Mullins led the denomination to adopt the original BF&M in 1925. Described as "the New Hampshire Confession of Faith [of 1833], revised at certain points, and with some additional articles growing out of present needs," it was intended as "a reaffirmation of Christian fundamentals," which was deemed necessary because of "the prevalence of naturalism in the modern teaching and preaching of religion." 

The BF&M was revised in 1963 (under the chairmanship of pastor-theologian Herschel H. Hobbs), amended in 1998 (with the addition of Section XVIII on The Family), and again revised in 2000 under the chairmanship of pastor-author and former three-time SBC President Adrian Rogers; the 2000 revisions incorporated sociological as well as theological changes and were considered the most controversial.

Position Statements
The BF&M includes 18 topics which are position statements of the SBC.  Each article or position is followed by Scripture which they use to support their position.

Reception
There was both praise and criticism for the significant changes to the BF&M in the 2000 revision.

Affirmations
Some of the changes that were particularly well received (affirmations) by some Baptist theologians include the following:
The controversial use of the word "inerrancy" was not inserted into the section on Scripture. Some were concerned that it would be included.
No inclusion of more restrictive views of eschatology, such as dispensationalism. Apprehension had been expressed that such views might be espoused in the revisions.
Inclusion of a statement that Baptists honor the principles of soul competency and the priesthood of believer.
Reaffirmation of most historical Baptist convictions.
Addresses issues of contemporary concern – soteriological inclusivism (Section IV), family (Section XVIII), gender (Section III), sexual immorality, adultery, homosexuality, pornography, and abortion (Section XV).
Clear expressions about the future direction of the SBC under the "conservative resurgency" leadership.
Editorial changes, such as the use of gender-inclusive language, considered improvements of the form of the statement.

Criticisms
In 2001, Russell Dilday of the Center for Baptist Studies at Mercer University, raised 12 controversial points about the 2000 revision. The most controversial points were in the areas of male priority (in marriage and in ministry, specifically the pastorate), the exegetical standard by which the Bible is to be interpreted, and a catalogue of specific sins.

Gender-based roles
For the first time in SBC history, provisions were added to define male-headship gender roles in both the ministry and in marriage.

Regarding ministry, the BF&M now explicitly defines the pastoral office as the exclusive domain of men – thus prohibiting female pastors. While not stated in the 2000 BF&M, some churches also apply this interpretation to deacons, being a pastoral office of the church, and will not ordain women or allow them to serve as deacons.

Regarding marriage, the BF&M added Article XVIII to specify the husband is the head of the household (though it is to be understood in a complementarian role, not as an autocrat). Nothing in the BF&M prohibits or discourages the wife from holding outside employment, nor the husband from doing household duties traditionally considered those of the wife.

Exegetical standard
Second, the 2000 revision of the BF&M removed the assertion that the person of Jesus Christ was to be the exegetical standard by which the Bible was to be interpreted, and replaced it with the last sentence in the quotation below.

The change was made over concerns that some groups were elevating the recorded words of Jesus in Scripture over other Scriptural passages (or, in some cases, claiming that Jesus' silence on an issue held priority over other passages explicitly discussing a topic, an example being homosexuality). The traditional SBC view is that  Scripture is  inspired by God.

This revision was particularly objectionable to the Baptist General Convention of Texas, the largest SBC state convention, which had previously split between moderates and conservatives, with the latter forming the Southern Baptists of Texas Convention.

Catalogue of specific sins
The 2000 BF&M has been criticized for including a specific list of contemporary sins, which could lead to endless additions.

See also
List of Baptist confessions
Creed

Notes

References

External links 
 Baptist Faith & Message (2000, with Scripture references)
 Comparison of 1925, 1963 and 2000 Baptist Faith and Message (the 1963 version contains the 1998 amendment)

Southern Baptist Convention
Baptist statements of faith

1925 documents
1925 in Christianity